The 1974–75 Swedish Division I season was the 31st and final season of Swedish Division I. It was replaced by the Elitserien for 1975–76. Leksands IF won the final Division I title by defeating Brynas IF in the final.

Regular season

Playoffs

Semifinals
Leksands IF – Skellefteå AIK 4–2, 3–2
Brynäs IF – Timrå IK 4–2, 1–6, 4–1

3rd place
Timrå IK – Skellefteå AIK 3–2, 2–6, 7–5

Final
Leksands IF – Brynäs IF 3–2, 6–7, 3–2 OT

External links
 1974–75 season

1975 Swedish national championship finals at SVT's open archive 

Swedish
Swedish Division I seasons
1974–75 in Swedish ice hockey